Qaleh Dokhtar (also Romanized as Qal‘eh Dokhtar and Qal‘eh-ye Dokhtar; also known as Sar Dasht) is a village in Doshman Ziari Rural District, in the Central District of Kohgiluyeh County, Kohgiluyeh and Boyer-Ahmad Province, Iran. At the 2006 census, its population was 495, in 100 families.

References 

Populated places in Kohgiluyeh County